Lilly McDaniel Ledbetter (born April 14, 1938) is an American activist who was the plaintiff in the United States Supreme Court  case Ledbetter v. Goodyear Tire & Rubber Co. regarding employment discrimination. Two years after the Supreme Court decided that Title VII of the Civil Rights Act of 1964 does not allow employers to be sued for pay discrimination more than 180 days after an employee's first paycheck, the United States Congress passed a fair pay act in her name to remedy this issue, the Lilly Ledbetter Fair Pay Act of 2009. She has since become a women's equality activist, public speaker, and author. In 2011, Ledbetter was inducted into the National Women's Hall of Fame.

Personal life
Ledbetter was born Lilly McDaniel in Jacksonville, Alabama, and graduated from Jacksonville High School in 1956. Her father J.C. McDaniel was a mechanic at the Anniston Army Depot. After graduating from high school, Lilly McDaniel married Charles Ledbetter and had two children, Vicky and Phillip . She remained married until Charles's death in December 2008. Ledbetter worked at Jacksonville State University in Jacksonville, Alabama, as the Assistant Director-Financial Aid from May 1974 to December 1975.

Ledbetter v. Goodyear Tire & Rubber Co. 

In 1979, Lilly Ledbetter was hired by Goodyear, working as a supervisor. After working for Goodyear for nineteen years, Ledbetter received an anonymous note revealing that she was making thousands less per year than the men in her position. Only as she neared retirement did she learn she was being paid significantly less than male colleagues with similar seniority and experience. This letter led her to file a sex discrimination case against Goodyear for paying her significantly less than her male counterparts. She successfully sued Goodyear but the judgment was reversed on appeal by the Eleventh Circuit. The lawsuit eventually reached the Supreme Court, which ruled against her because she did not file suit 180 days from the date of the discriminatory policy that led to her reduced paycheck, though the paycheck itself was issued during the 180-day period. The Supreme Court did not consider the issue of whether a plaintiff's late discovery of a discriminatory action would excuse a failure to file within the 180-day period because her attorneys conceded it would have made no difference in her case. In dissent, United States Supreme Court Justice Ruth Bader Ginsburg wrote:

Lilly Ledbetter was a supervisor at Goodyear Tire and Rubber’s plant in Gadsden, Alabama, from 1979 until her retirement in 1998. For most of those years, she worked as an area manager, a position largely occupied by men. Initially, Ledbetter’s salary was in line with the salaries of men performing substantially similar work. Over time, however, her pay slipped in comparison to the pay of male area managers with equal or less seniority. By the end of 1997, Ledbetter was the only woman working as an area manager and the pay discrepancy between Ledbetter and her 15 male counterparts was stark: Ledbetter was paid $3,727 per month; the lowest paid male area manager received $4,286 per month, the highest paid, $5,236.
In response, Congress later passed legislation, called the Lilly Ledbetter Fair Pay Act of 2009, that restarted the 180-day clock every time a discriminatory paycheck was received.

Lilly Ledbetter Fair Pay Act of 2009 
Subsequently, the 111th United States Congress passed the Lilly Ledbetter Fair Pay Act in 2009 to loosen the timeliness requirements for the filing of a discrimination suit so long as any act of discrimination, including receipt of a paycheck that reflects a past act of discrimination, occurs within the 180-day period of limitations. The act sought to reverse the Supreme Court's ruling in Ledbetter v. Goodyear, which restricted the time period for filing pay discrimination claims, making it more difficult for workers to file a complaint. Under this bill, every discriminatory paycheck or other compensation can be filed, unrestricted from a time period for filing a claim of pay discrimination.

Passage of the act did not result in Ledbetter receiving a settlement from Goodyear. Although she has not received restitution from Goodyear, she has said, "I'll be happy if the last thing they say about me after I die is that I made a difference."

The Lilly Ledbetter Fair Pay Act was President Barack Obama’s first official piece of legislation as president. He said: “When I came into office, we passed something called the Lilly Ledbetter Act, named after a good friend of mine, Lilly Ledbetter, who had worked for years and found out long into her work that she had been getting paid all these years less than men, substantially. She brought suit. They said, well, it’s too late to file suit because you should have filed suit right when it started happening. She said, I just found out. They said, it doesn’t matter. So we changed that law to allow somebody like Lilly, when they find out, to finally be able to go ahead and file suit.”

By 2011, over 350 cases had already cited the Ledbetter decision since it was handed down in 2009.

Ruth Bader Ginsburg had a framed copy of the bill, Lilly Ledbetter Fair Pay Act, in her chambers.

Women's equality
On August 26, 2008 (Women's Equality Day), Lilly Ledbetter spoke at the Democratic National Convention in Denver, Colorado, on the topic of pay equity. 

In February 2012, Ledbetter released Grace and Grit: My Fight for Equal Pay and Fairness at Goodyear and Beyond, a memoir detailing her struggle for equal pay. Her book chronicles her life from her humble beginnings in Alabama to the passage of the Lilly Ledbetter Fair Pay Act, signed by President Obama in 2009. On October 31, 2012, Lilly Ledbetter appeared as a guest on the Colbert Report to promote the book.

On September 4, 2012, she spoke at the Democratic National Convention in Charlotte, North Carolina. She said, "This cause, which bears my name, is bigger than me. It's as big as all of you. This fight, which began as my own, is now our fight—a fight for the fundamental American values that make our country great." Ledbetter also declared that "what we lose can't just be measured in dollars."

Books

References

External links

 
 
 

1938 births
Goodyear Tire and Rubber Company people
Living people
People from Jacksonville, Alabama
Alabama Democrats
Activists from Alabama